The Makira honeyeater (Meliarchus sclateri), also known as the San Cristobal honeyeater, is a species of bird in the family Meliphagidae.
It is endemic to Makira in the Solomon Islands.

References 

 BirdLife International 2004.  Melidectes sclateri.   2006 IUCN Red List of Threatened Species.   Downloaded on 26 July 2007.

Makira honeyeater
Birds of Makira
Makira honeyeater
Makira honeyeater
Taxonomy articles created by Polbot